Tim Smith (born 1961 in Swindon) is an English broadcaster and radio personality in the UK. He is best known as being part of the team for Steve Wright in the Afternoon on BBC Radio 2.

On 1 July 2022 Wright announced that his afternoon show would end in Autumn 2022, after 23 years. It was also announced that Smith would be leaving BBC Radio 2, together with Janey Lee Grace.

Career
Smith started out on university radio whilst studying in York. From 1984 he worked for several stations including BBC Radio York and BBC Radio Shropshire.  On 1 April 1989, after a short stint with BBC WM, Tim joined BBC Radio 1 to present the weekend early show from 5 to 7am. He presented Top of the Pops on only one occasion alongside Anthea Turner. During the 1990s he presented on BBC Radio London, presenting the Picture Show that was nominated for a Sony Award. He also presented the breakfast show on Magic 105.8 and Jazz FM. He joined BBC Radio 2 in 1999 as a co-presenter on Steve Wright in the Afternoon, as part of the team with Janey Lee Grace and the "old woman" Joyce Frost. During his time on the show, he has interviewed a number of celebrities, and alongside Wright, co-interviewed the Prime Minister, Tony Blair. He is well known on the show for reading out lists of trivial information known as "factoids".

He also presented his own show on BBC Radio Oxford on Saturday mornings until April 2019. Tim is a keen golfer, and regularly presents a podcast on the sport with BBC journalist Rob Nothman and comedian Patrick Kielty. He has also co-presented online coverage of the Wimbledon Championships and the 2000 Open Golf Championship in St Andrews. In 2018, he presented an episode of Celebrity Antiques Road Trip with Janey Lee Grace.

Smith provides podcasts for some of UK's biggest companies, including BAE Systems, Network Rail, BT, Jaguar Land Rover, Diageo, UK Power Networks and McVitie's. In 2016, for BAE Systems, he hosted a special edition podcast live from Farnborough International Air Show.

References

BBC Radio 1 presenters
BBC Radio 2 presenters
English radio DJs
1961 births
Living people
People from Swindon
Alumni of York St John University